Family Video Diaries: Daughter of the Bride is a 1997 American short documentary film directed by Terri Randall. It was nominated for an Academy Award for Best Documentary Short.

References

External links

Daughter of the Bride at Direct Cinema

1997 films
1990s short documentary films
American short documentary films
1997 independent films
American independent films
Documentary films about families
1990s English-language films
1990s American films